Noise refers to many types of random, troublesome, problematic, or unwanted signals.

Acoustic noise may mar aesthetic experience, such as attending a concert hall. It may also be a medical issue inherent in the biology of hearing. 

In technology, noise is unwanted signals in a device or apparatus, commonly of an electrical nature. The nature of noise is much studied in mathematics and is a prominent topic in statistics. 

This article provides a survey of specific topics linked to their primary articles.

Acoustic noise

In transportation
Aircraft noise
Jet noise, caused by high-velocity jets and turbulent eddies
Noise and vibration on maritime vessels
Noise, vibration, and harshness, quality criteria for vehicles
Traffic noise, including roadway noise and train noise

Other acoustic noise
Acoustic noise, technical term for any sound, even deliberate
Artificial noise, in spectator sports
Background noise, in acoustics, any sound other than the monitored one
Comfort noise, used in telecommunications to fill silent gaps
Grey noise, random noise with a psychoacoustic adjusted spectrum
Industrial noise, relevant to hearing damage and industrial hygiene
Noise pollution, that affects negatively the quality of life

Noise in biology
Cellular noise, in biology, random variability between cells
Developmental noise, variations among living beings with the same genome
Neuronal noise, in neuroscience
Synaptic noise, in neuroscience
Transcriptional noise, in biochemistry, errors in genetic transcription

Noise in computer graphics
Noise in computer graphics refers to various pseudo-random functions used to create textures, including:
Gradient noise, created by interpolation of a lattice of pseudorandom gradients
Perlin noise, a type of gradient noise developed in 1983
Simplex noise, a method for constructing an n-dimensional noise function comparable to Perlin noise
Simulation noise, a function that creates a divergence-free field
Value noise, created by interpolation of a lattice of pseudorandom values; differs from gradient noise
Wavelet noise, an alternative to Perlin noise which reduces problems of aliasing and detail loss 
Worley noise, a noise function introduced by Steven Worley in 1996

Noise in electronics and radio
Noise (signal processing), various types of interference
Noise (electronics), related to electronic circuitry
Ground noise, appearing at the ground terminal of audio equipment
Image noise, related to digital photography
Noise (radio), interference related to radio signals
Atmospheric noise, radio noise caused by lightning
Cosmic noise, radio noise from outside the Earth's atmosphere
Noise (video), "snow" on video or television pictures

Noise in mathematics
Any one of many statistical types or colors of noise, such as
White noise, which has constant power spectral density
Gaussian noise, with a probability density function equal to that of the normal distribution
Pink noise, with spectral density inversely proportional to frequency
Brownian noise or "brown" noise, with spectral density inversely proportional to the square of frequency
Pseudorandom noise, in cryptography, artificial signal that can pass for random
Statistical noise, a colloquialism for recognized amounts of unexplained variation in a sample
Shot noise, noise which can be modeled by a Poisson process
Noise-based logic, where logic values are different stochastic processes
Noise print, a statistical signature of ambient noise, used in its suppression

Other types of noise

Electrochemical noise, electrical fluctuations in electrolysis, corrosion, etc.
Phonon noise, in materials science
Seismic noise, random tremors of the ground

Measures of noise intensity 
Noise figure, the ratio of the output noise power to attributable thermal noise
Ambient noise level, the background sound pressure level at a given location
Noise power, with several related meanings
Noise spectral density, No measured in Watt/Hertz
Noise temperature, temperature that would produce equivalent semiconductor noise

See also
Noise (disambiguation)

Broad-concept articles
 
Noise (electronics)
Mechanical vibrations